Naming of planets may refer to:

, for the planets of the Solar System
Planetary nomenclature, for features on those planets
Exoplanet naming convention, for planets outside the Solar System
Minor-planet designation, for initial designations of dwarf planets, asteroids etc.
Meanings of minor-planet names, for later names of those bodies